Nodulosphaeria is a genus of fungi in the family Phaeosphaeriaceae.

References

Phaeosphaeriaceae
Taxa named by Gottlob Ludwig Rabenhorst